Local elections were held in Rizal on May 13, 2013, as part of the 2013 general election. Voters will select candidates for all local positions: a municipal/city mayor, vice mayor and town councilors, as well as members of the Sangguniang Panlalawigan, the vice-governor, governor and representatives for the two districts of Rizal.

Results

For Governor 
Former Governor Rebecca "Nini" Ynares won the elections.

For Vice Governor 
Vice Governor Frisco San Juan Jr. was re-elected unopposed.

Congressional elections

1st District
Joel Duavit is running for reelection unopposed.

2nd District
Isidro Rodriguez Jr. is running for reelection unopposed.

Antipolo

1st District

2nd District
Romeo Acop is the incumbent.

Provincial Board elections
All 2 Districts of Rizal will elect Sangguniang Panlalawigan or provincial board members.

1st District
Municipalities: Angono, Binangonan, Cainta, Taytay
Parties are as stated in their certificate of candidacies.

2nd District
Municipalities: Baras, Cardona, Jala-Jala, Morong, Pililla, Rodriguez (Montalban), San Mateo, Tanay, Teresa
Parties are as stated in their certificate of candidacies.

|-

|-

Antipolo

1st District
Parties are as stated in their certificate of candidacies.

|-

|-

2nd District
Parties are as stated in their certificate of candidacies.

|-

|-

City and Municipality Elections
All municipalities and City of Antipolo in Rizal will elect mayor and vice-mayor this election. The candidates for mayor and vice mayor with the highest number of votes wins the seat; they are voted separately, therefore, they may be of different parties when elected. Below is the list of mayoralty and vice-mayoralty candidates of each city and municipalities per district.

1st District
Municipalities: Angono, Binangonan, Cainta, Taytay

Angono

Binangonan

Cainta

Taytay

2nd District
Municipalities: Baras, Cardona, Jala-Jala, Morong, Pililla, Rodriguez (Montalban), San Mateo, Tanay, Teresa

Baras

Cardona

Jala-Jala

Morong

Pililla

Rodriguez (Montalban)

San Mateo

Tanay

Teresa

Antipolo

References

2013 Philippine local elections
Elections in Rizal
2013 elections in Calabarzon